Preston Court Apartments is a historic apartment building in Charlottesville, Virginia, US built in 1928. It is a three-story, "C"-shaped, reinforced concrete building faced with brick.  It has two two-story, five-bay, flat-roofed Ionic order porticos in the Classical Revival style. The building continues to be used as a rental/apartment building by the Hartman family.

It was listed on the National Register of Historic Places in 2007.  It is located in the Rugby Road-University Corner Historic District.

References

Residential buildings on the National Register of Historic Places in Virginia
Neoclassical architecture in Virginia
Residential buildings completed in 1928
Buildings and structures in Charlottesville, Virginia
National Register of Historic Places in Charlottesville, Virginia
Individually listed contributing properties to historic districts on the National Register in Virginia